Blackout is the third book in the Newsflesh series of science fiction/horror novels set after a zombie apocalypse, written by Seanan McGuire under the pen name Mira Grant, and published by Orbit Books. It was published June 1, 2012 and preceded by Feed (2010) and Deadline (2011), and followed by ‘’Feedback’’ (2016).

Plot
Blackout is set several decades after the zombie apocalypse, the Rising. Most humans reside in controlled zones, and blogs are now the primary source of news and entertainment. The novel is written from the perspectives of Georgia and Shaun Mason, siblings and blogger-reporters. Over the preceding books, they, along with their colleagues at the After The End Times website, have uncovered a widespread conspiracy. The Centers for Disease Control (CDC), the agency responding to the zombie virus and responsible for public health and safety, is actually creating new substrains (culminating in a mosquito-transmitted variant released at the end of Deadline), killing off those developing immune responses (including Georgia, who was assassinated during the events of Feed), and frustrating research into a cure.

Shaun Mason, having discovered his immunity to the virus, is helping with Dr. Abbey's zombie research while hiding out from the CDC with the rest of the After the End Times team: Rebecca Atherton, Mahir Gowda, Maggie Garcia, and Alaric Kwong. Dr. Abbey tasks Shaun and Rebecca with travelling to zombie-infested Florida and recovering live mosquitoes for study, but when they head back to Berkeley, California to meet with Shaun's adoptive parents, they are lured into a trap and barely escape the CDC. Disheartened, Shaun and Rebecca head north to Seattle, where Maggie and Mahir have contacted the identity forger, the Monkey. He agrees to help them disappear with new identities if they help steal information from the Seattle CDC facility. The team, minus Maggie, breaks in and set up a remote-access Wi-Fi hotspot, but their escape is hampered by a security alert.

After dying, Georgia awakens as a prisoner in a CDC facility and quickly concludes that she is a clone. With the help of Epidemic Intelligence Service (EIS) undercover agents, Georgia learns she is a 97 percent match to the mind of the original Georgia and is intended as a "showroom model" for resurrection through cloning. She also discovers she is in Seattle, and other Georgia clones have been created, including a less mentally accurate but more compliant version for use against Shaun. The agents use a week-long sleep study as a cover to remove trackers and self-destruct devices implanted in Georgia's body, but a mole exposes the EIS team. Georgia escapes and takes the security alert as an opportunity to destroy the other clones.

Shaun, seeking an exit, runs into Georgia, fleeing her improvised explosives. They link up with Rebecca and Mahir, and escape to meet Maggie at the Agora luxury hotel. Although initially reluctant to accept Georgia's existence, her mannerisms and knowledge of Georgia's life, including an incestuous relationship between Georgia and Shaun, gradually convince the group that she is a real, accurate clone. They go to see the Monkey but are betrayed by one of his subordinates. A CDC squad attacks the location: the Monkey and his people are killed, and Maggie is wounded. She is left at the Agora for treatment, and the team heads back to Dr. Abbey's lab, where an EIS agent is waiting to transport them to Washington, D.C.. They are taken to the White House by Rick Cousins (former After the End Times journalist, now Vice President of the United States) to meet President Peter Ryman, who is being coerced to continue the conspiracy.

The CDC has found a cure for Kellis-Amberlee, but the cure destroys the immune system so instead, they have focused on engineering the virus to prevent natural immunities from developing, while taking measures to ensure they remain in power. While Shaun, Becks, and Alaric are briefed on (and secretly recording) the party line by a CDC scientist, Rick takes Georgia aside to explain the situation before they, with help from the EIS and the Secret Service, "kidnap" Ryman. The CDC initiates an outbreak inside the White House, during which Rebecca sacrifices herself to hold back the horde while the others escape. The survivors head to an EIS facility, where Shaun and Georgia help Ryman address the world, while Mahir orchestrates junior members of After the End Times to upload supporting evidence and blow the conspiracy wide open. As the world comes to terms with the revelations, the EIS takes over the CDC, while Georgia and Shaun head to the wilds of Canada to escape the limelight.

Background
Shortly before the 22 May release of Blackout (2012), McGuire released Fed, an alternate ending to the first Newsflesh novel, Feed (2010). The alternate ending was initially made available on Facebook on 17 May, then released online by Orbit on 23 May.

Reception
Blackout was nominated for the 2013 Hugo Award for Best Novel. The novel was beaten by John Scalzi's ''Redshirts (2012).

References

Novels by Seanan McGuire
2012 American novels
American zombie novels
American post-apocalyptic novels
Orbit Books books